Kenneth Kay (9 March 1920 – 1986) was an English professional footballer who played in the Football League for Mansfield Town.

References

1920 births
1986 deaths
English footballers
Association football forwards
English Football League players
Ransome & Marles F.C. players
Mansfield Town F.C. players
Peterborough United F.C. players